The Morton N. Cohen Award for a Distinguished Edition of Letters is a biennial prize given to an editor by the Modern Language Association.

Description 

The award was established in 1989 by a gift from Morton N. Cohen, Professor Emeritus of English at the City University of New York. The award is presented each odd-numbered year.

The 2017 prize will be awarded for a book published in 2015 or 2016.

Notable winners 

Past winners of the prize include:

2011–12: Roger Kuin, York University, for The Correspondence of Sir Philip Sidney

2009–10: Martha Dow Fehsenfeld, Emory University; Lois More Overbeck, Emory University; George Craig, University of Sussex; and Dan Gunn, American University of Paris; for The Letters of Samuel Beckett, Volume 1: 1929–1940

2007–08: William G. Holzberger, Bucknell University, for The Letters of George Santayana, Book Seven, 1941–1947 and Book Eight, 1948–1952

2005–06: John Kelly, Oxford University, and Ronald Schuchard, Emory University, for The Collected Letters of W. B. Yeats, Volume 4

2003–04: Robert J. Bertholf, State University of New York, Buffalo, and Albert Gelpi, Stanford University, for The Letters of Robert Duncan and Denise Levertov

References

External links
 

Academic awards
Awards established in 1989